General elections were held in Japan on 31 March 1937. Rikken Minseitō emerged as the largest in Parliament, with 179 of the 466 seats. The election was a major victory for the Shakai Taishūtō, which became the third-largest party in the Diet. It was the first socialist party to do so in Japanese history. In contrast, the mildly pro-military Rikken Minseitō lost several seats and fascist groups such as Tōhōkai remained minor forces in the House. A month after the election, the Emperor replaced Hayashi with Fumimaro Konoe. Voter turnout was 73.3%.

Background
In February 1937, General Senjūrō Hayashi was appointed prime minister. Just days after taking office and having the Diet enact a budget bill, he ordered a dissolution of the House of Representatives, hoping to weaken the major political parties.

In 1941, the Diet under the Konoe government passed a law extending the term of the Representatives from four years to five (衆議院議員任期延長ニ関スル法律). This allowed time to solidify the control of the Imperial Rule Assistance Association over Japanese politics. The Association effectively replaced all political parties in Japan and subsequently dominated the 1942 general election, although numerous factions developed within the Association's caucus in the House. The term extension was effectively repealed by the Constitution of Japan in 1947, which returned the representatives' term of office to 4 years.

Results

By prefecture

References

General elections in Japan
Japan
1937 elections in Japan
Politics of the Empire of Japan
April 1937 events
Election and referendum articles with incomplete results